Dukhulal Nibaran Chandra College, popularly known as DNC college established in 1967, is the college in Aurangabad, in Murshidabad district. It offers undergraduate courses in Arts, Commerce and Sciences. It is affiliated to University of Kalyani.

History 
Dukhulal Nibaran Chandra College was established in 1967. Earlier the college was affiliated to the University of Calcutta, and now it is under the jurisdiction of University of Kalyani. It was the academic session 2000- 2001 when DNC College was included under University of Kalyani like any other colleges in Murshidabad and Nadia. The name Dukhulal Nibaran Chandra College was unanimously then chosen to commemorate the two brothers, namely, Dukhulal Das and Nibaran Chandra Das. Prof. Dr Satyendranath Sen inaugurated the Main College Building, the then Vice-Chancellor of Calcutta University, on 11th Nov. 1968. In 2009 the college was accredited by NAAC with Grade ‘B’.

Notable alumni

Departments

Science

Chemistry
Physics
Mathematics
Botany
Zoology
Geography

Arts and Commerce
Arabic
Bengali
English
Sanskrit
History
Political Science
Philosophy
Education
Economics
Commerce

Accreditation
The college is recognized by the University Grants Commission (UGC).

See also

References

External links

University of Kalyani
University Grants Commission
National Assessment and Accreditation Council

Universities and colleges in Murshidabad district
Colleges affiliated to University of Kalyani
Educational institutions established in 1967
1967 establishments in West Bengal